Isabella Daza De Leon (born on 30 July 1994), also known as Isabelle De Leon, is a Filipino actress, singer-songwriter and beauty queen. She was a former child actress, known to many as Duday in GMA-7's sitcom Daddy Di Do Du (2001). She garnered a FAMAS Best Child Actress award for her role in Magnifico (2003). Isabelle was crowned as Miss Multinational Philippines at Miss World Philippines 2019. She was supposed to represent Philippines at the Miss Multinational pageant but it was postponed from 2020 to 2021 due to the pandemic.

Career
Isabelle De Leon was featured in the title role of the GMA drama series Munting Anghel in 2000. She played Vic Sotto's daughter in the 2001-2007 sitcom Daddy DiDoDu. De Leon also appeared in a string of TV shows including Love to Love, Mulawin, Fantastikids, Mga Mata ni Anghelita and as Chrissy Altamira in Nasaan Ka Elisa?. She also played the role of Digna in Maria Mercedes.

She also appeared in movies such as Magnifico, Bahay ni Lola, Super-B, Sanib, Padre de Pamilya, Litsonero and Soliloquy.

In 2013, she made her debut as a recording artist under PolyEast Records. She released her debut album, LoveZone, which consisted of original songs, all written by her. On September 13, 2014, she starred in the TV-5 TV series Trenderas alongside Lara Maigue and A.K.A. Jam member Katrina Velarde. De Leon starred recently in a Wattpad entitled Diary ng Hindi Malandi, Slight Lang by Owwsic where she played the lead character Pilar Payoson a.k.a. Pipay. She also starred in another Wattpad series entitled Mistakenly Meant for You as the lead character Irina Sobel Samonte a.k.a. ICE.

In 2019, she has played as young Maricar de Mesa's character from Dragon Lady to opposite Bea Binene which portrays as young Diana Zubiri after her first antagonist in Magkaibang Mundo to opposite Louise delos Reyes.

In 2020, she went freelance and returned to ABS-CBN and is currently portraying the role of Marielle Lascano in the longest-running teleserye, Ang Probinsyano. De Leon will also co-bill a new drama show on TV5 Network titled Ate ng Ate Ko , along with Kris Bernal, Jake Cuenca, and Joem Bascon. Her role will be Mayumi Gonzales.

Filmography

Television Series

Television Anthologies

Film
Unli Life (2018)
My Big Bossing  (2014)
Soliloquy (2009)
Litsonero (2009)
Padre de Pamilya (2009)
Bahay Kubo: A Pinoy Mano Po! (2007)
Lastikman: Unang Banat (2004)
Santa Santita (2004)
Kilig... Pintig... Yanig... (2004)
Sanib (2003) as Magdalene "Magda" Santiago
Magnifico (2003)
Super-B (2002)
Bahay ni Lola (2001)
Ano Bang Meron Ka? (2001)

Discography

Album
LoveZone (2013)
"1 Week to Move On"
"Feelingero"
"Friend Zone"
"Sa Yakap Mo"
"Alice Wonders"
"Pag-ibig Ko'y Sa'yo"

Awards and nominations

2003 Best Child actress Pasado Award
2004 Best Child Actress FAMAS Award
2004 Best Child actress Gawad Tanglaw
2004 Most Popular Child Actress Guillermo mendoza memorial scholarship foundation
2004 Best supporting actress PMPC Star awards for Movies

All awards are won, and it’s from the movie “MAGNIFICO”

References

External links

1994 births
Living people
Actresses from Manila
Filipino child actresses
21st-century Filipino women singers
Filipino television actresses
GMA Network personalities
ABS-CBN personalities
TV5 (Philippine TV network) personalities
Miss World Philippines winners